Andrey Kondryshev (born 24 August 1983) is a Kazakhstani cross-country skier. He competed in the men's 50 kilometre freestyle event at the 2006 Winter Olympics.

References

1983 births
Living people
Kazakhstani male cross-country skiers
Olympic cross-country skiers of Kazakhstan
Cross-country skiers at the 2006 Winter Olympics
People from Kostanay
Asian Games medalists in cross-country skiing
Cross-country skiers at the 2007 Asian Winter Games
Medalists at the 2007 Asian Winter Games
Asian Games gold medalists for Kazakhstan
Asian Games silver medalists for Kazakhstan
21st-century Kazakhstani people